Ernst Gronau (21 August 1887 – 10 August  1938) was a German stage, writer and film actor.

Selected filmography
 Prostitution (1919)
 Genuine (1920)
 Roswolsky's Mistress (1921)
 The Graveyard of the Living (1921)
 Miss Julie (1922)
 The Stream (1922)
 The Curse of Silence (1922)
 The Game with Women (1922)
 Man by the Wayside (1923)
 And Yet Luck Came (1923)
 Liebesbriefe der Baronin von S... (1924)
 Wood Love (1925)
 His Late Excellency (1927)
 Prinz Louis Ferdinand (1927)
 Father and Son (1930)
 I for You, You for Me (1934)

Bibliography
 Jung, Uli & Schatzberg, Walter. Beyond Caligari: The Films of Robert Wiene. Berghahn Books, 1999.

External links

1887 births
1938 deaths
German male film actors
German male silent film actors
German male stage actors
People from Klaipėda
People from East Prussia
20th-century German male actors